Scott Wyatt (born 1969) is an American politician. A Republican, he is a member of the Virginia House of Delegates, representing the 97th district.

Biography
Wyatt was born in Richmond, Virginia and served on the Hanover County Board of Supervisors for 4 years, representing the Cold Harbor district.

Wyatt is a member of the neo-Confederate organization known as the Sons of Confederate Veterans.

Political career

2019

After incumbent Chris Peace voted to expand Medicaid, local Republican party representatives chose to nominate Wyatt instead after a divisive convention.

In the general election, Wyatt defeated Democrat Kevin Washington with 55.7% of the vote. 17.7% of the votes were write-ins, most likely for Chris Peace.

References

Living people
Republican Party members of the Virginia House of Delegates
21st-century American politicians
Politicians from Richmond, Virginia
County supervisors in Virginia
1969 births